The Roads Beautifying Association (1928–) was founded in the United Kingdom by Lord Mount Temple, the Minister of Transport in 1928 who appointed as its (Hon.) Secretary Dr. Wilfrid Fox who served throughout and whose work was praised on the organisation's demise by government and opposition alike. 

The association had the aim of creating better planted and more aesthetically pleasing roads to accommodate cars around the United Kingdom. It published Roadside Planting in 1930.  It contributed in biodiversity, overall layout and on safety grounds to many public works programs.

Membership and activities
Its members were chosen for knowledge and experience and chiefly included: Lionel de Rothschild, who was Chairman of the Royal Horticultural Society (RHS), Mr. F. R. S. Balfour, Sir Arthur Hill, Mr. W. J. Bean (author of Trees and Hardy Shrubs in the British Isles), Col. Stern who was expert on planting in chalky soils, Arthur Cotton, who was the keeper of the herbarium at RHS Kew Gardens and became President of the Linnean Society of London, Mr. Gardner, Secretary of the English Forestry Association, Sir Charles Bressey, an eminent road engineer, from the mid 1930s Lord Aberconway, who became President of the RHS, Sir Edward James Salisbury, botanist and ecologist, Roy Robinson, 1st Baron Robinson, forester, and also representatives of the A.A., the R.A.C., the British Road Federation, representatives of Kew Gardens and, labelled as 'very important' by the last President (the 10th Duke of Devonshire)—a business of tree and other plant nurseries which invested its time and advised willingly.

The association had the aim of increasing the publicly maintainable biophysical environment around the new roads being built to accommodate cars around the United Kingdom, particularly along new roads and especially new trunk roads. It published Roadside Planting in 1930.  It contributed aesthetically and on safety grounds to public works programs, funded by local authorities and central government.

The RBA went on for almost a decade on a self-promoted voluntary consultative basis, increasing its circle of contacts among local authorities and doing more and more work with only Ministerial best practice guidance to local authorities to consult it, until, in 1937 the Ministry gave it a grant for promoting its work of £200 a year and urged all local authorities to consult the RBA.

Disbandment
The Association, to advertise its existence and that its advice was available, held a sherry party to which it invited the Minister for Transport four years into the six-year Attlee Ministry.   This was summarized by the bulk of the House of Lords' speech of the RBA President, The 10th Duke of Devonshire, Conservative:

The 5th Earl of Listowel of the governing party—in a time of economic hardship replied:

See also
Road safety audit
 Town and country planning

References

Environment of the United Kingdom
1928 establishments in the United Kingdom
Organizations established in 1928
1949 disestablishments in the United Kingdom